Gaya Town Assembly constituency is one of the 243 state Legislative Assembly seats in Bihar.

Members of Legislative Assembly

Election results

2020

2015

2010

|}

References

External links
 

Assembly constituencies of Bihar